Olavsrosa (St. Olaf's rose) is a seal of quality, awarded by the ideal Norwegian organization Norsk Kulturarv/Norwegian Heritage.

The goal of the foundation Norsk Kulturarv is to contribute to the protection of Norwegian cultural heritage through sustainable use, under the motto: «Protection through use»

Olavsrosa is awarded to firms and institutions that offer activities and experiences of particularly high standard, with regard to the presentation and use of Norwegian cultural history, and currently (2016) 131 firms and institutions have been awarded this seal of quality.

Olavsrosa recipients (selection) 
 Dalen Hotel
 Eidsvollsbygningen
 Isfjord radio
 Kongsvoll
 Krøderen Line
  Kvebergsøya
 Nordre Ekre
 Norwegian Museum of Hydropower and Industry
 Norwegian Sawmill Museum
 Numedal Line
 Parkteatret
 Quality Hotel 33, Oslo
 Refsnes Gods
 Ryvarden Lighthouse
 Sandtorg
 Sjøgata
 Skibladner
 Southern Actor
 SS Bjoren
 Sygard Grytting
 Utstein Abbey
 Thamshavn Line
 Ytste Skotet

References

Literature 
N.N. (1998) Norsk kulturarv – ei praktisk reisehåndbok. Vågå: Norsk kulturarv.  (Norwegian)

External links 
Norsk Kulturarv/Norwegian Heritage's website (Norwegian)
Norsk Kulturarv's English website – «under construction»

Cultural history of Norway
Quality awards
Trademarks